Cú Choigcríche Ó Cléirigh (fl. 1624–1664) was an Irish historian and genealogist, known in English as Peregrine O'Clery.

Life and work
Ó Cléirigh was a son of Diarmaid Ó Cléirigh, and thus a third-cousin once removed to Brother Mícheál Ó Cléirigh, whom he assisted in compiling the Annals of the Four Masters.

However, Paul Walsh believed him to be a son of Diarmad mac An Chosnamghaigh mac Concoigríche mac Diarmada Ó Cléirigh, who died in 1552. This Diarmaid was a brother of Tuthal (died 1512) and Giolla Riabhach (died 1527). Mícheál Ó Cléirigh was the son of Donnchaidh, a son of Uilliam son of Tuathail Ó Cléirigh, who died in 1512. The first modern-day editor of the annals, John O'Donovan, believed that Ó Cléirigh was the son of the poet and historian Lughaidh Ó Cléirigh, although this has since been disputed.

Along with Brother Mícheál, Ó Cléirigh transcribed the years 1332–1608 in the annals. The earliest copy of Lughaidh Ó Cléirigh's life of Aodh Ruadh Ó Domhnaill is in his handwriting. He also wrote a poem on Mary, sister of Red Hugh O'Donnell, who died in 1662, which is now among the Phillips Manuscripts at the National Library of Ireland.

He seems to have given material to Dubhaltach MacFhirbhisigh, which the latter inserted on page 299 of Leabhar na nGenealach

His own principal work is the compilation known as the O'Clery Book of Genealogies.

He died at Gortnaheltia, in the valley of Glenhest at the foot of Nephin Beg, overlooking Lough Beltra. He bequeathed his books to his sons Diarmaid and Seaán.

It is believed that Cú Choigcríche's descendants are the Cleary and Clarke families of Brackleagh, Glenhest, Burrishoole, County Mayo.

The O'Clery Book of Genealogies
 The O'Clery Book of Genealogies

See also

 Tadhg Og Ó Cianáin
 Peregrine Ó Duibhgeannain
 Lughaidh Ó Cléirigh
 Mícheál Ó Cléirigh
 James Ussher
 Sir James Ware
 Mary Bonaventure Browne
 Dubhaltach Mac Fhirbhisigh
 Ruaidhrí Ó Flaithbheartaigh
 Uilliam Ó Duinnín
 Charles O'Conor (historian)
 Eugene O'Curry
 John O'Donovan (scholar)

References

 http://www.ucc.ie/faculties/celtic/lss/c001/soc.htm

Sources

 O'Clerys in west Mayo, by Padraig Ó Móghráin, pp. 70–73, in Measgra i gCuimhne Mhichíl Chléirigh, ed. S. O'Brien, 1944.
 The Celebrated Antiquary: Dubhaltach Mac Fhirbhisigh (c.1600-1671) - His Life, Lineage and Learning,, by Nollaig Ó Muraíle, An Sagart, Maynooth, 1996; reprinted 2003. ; . See pages xix, 12, 20–1, 27, 59, 172, 176, 183, 214, 234–6, 275, 327–8.
 Notes on Cú Choigcríche Ó Cléirigh One of the Four Masters, Cathair na Mart 2001 (Journal of the Westport Historical Society), pp. 27–44, An Br. Angelo Mac Shamhais, OSF.
 Irish Leaders and Learning through the Ages, edited by Nollaig Ó Muraíle, Four Courts Press, Dublin, 2003. 

People from County Donegal
People from County Mayo
Irish scribes
17th-century Irish historians
Irish genealogists
Irish book and manuscript collectors
Year of birth unknown
Year of death unknown
Irish-language writers